Jeseník District(German: Bezirk Freiwaldau) is a district (okres) in the Olomouc Region of the Czech Republic. Its seat is the town of Jeseník. With approximately 38,000 inhabitants it is the least populated district of the Czech Republic.

The area called Jeseníky region is in the most northern bulge of Silesia and Moravia. It is closed by frontier with Poland that passes westward through Rychleby Hills and crosses the Nysa Lowlands to Zlaté Hory. The massif of Hrubý Jeseník in the south represents both the geomorphologic and climatic contrast to the lowlands of Javorník and Vidnava opened to Poland.

The town of Jeseník, an important crossing connection, connecting Silesia, separated by the mountain ridge from Moravia is the cultural and economic centre of the region. This town is situated at rivers Bělá and Staříč confluence forming a wide and branching valley where the diversity in the composition of nationalities is very diversified.

Nature

Mountains
The landscape relief of the Jeseník region is characteristic with the impressive mountain ridges of Hrubý Jeseník, towering as high as above the line of forests, with that flat ridges of Zlatohorská vrchovina (Highland) in the southeast, with the border range of Golden Mountains and its foothills Žulovská pahorkatina (Hilly Country) protruding from the lowlands at the Czech-Poland frontier in the northeast. All these mountain ridges are considered a part of the extensive unit of the Eastern Sudeten, now commonly called Jeseníky Mountains.

The uncovered top of Keprník (Mt., 1426 m) with its top rocks upon the Hrubý Jeseník, reaches the highest point in the region and on the contrary, the river Vidnavka leaves the country in the lowest point (230 m) at Vidnava. Most of the area is covered by forest. In higher locations there are mountain green-fields and varied flora. Originally broadleaved and fir forests have been recently substituted by the spruce monoculture. Bare spots above the line of forests (about 1330 m) are overgrown with grass and locally with man-planted dwarf pines. There are only few places where remnants of the original growth have been conserved. The deep forests of Golden Mountains and Žulovská pahorkatina passes into green-fields, pastures with scattered villages and lonely houses.

Rivers
Most of the rivers and streams belong to the area which feeds the Baltic sea with water: the biggest Bělá river with its tributary Staříč, the gold-bearing Černá Opava fed by Rejvíz highmoor bog water and river Vidnávka and its tributaries flowing down Golden Mountains. Mountain torrents from many waterfalls and cascades, in shallow depressions with impermeable underlying bed highmoor bogs originated. The springs on the hill-sides around the town of Jeseník, with favourable climate, are the critical agents for the rise of the spa resort.

The educational path Rejvíz with the Great Moss Pond and the Nýznerov Waterfalls at the Stříbrný Creek, Vidnavka grass-fields, Ztracené Údolí (Lost Valley) at Vápenná and many other places of interest are worth seeing. There are karst formations in the limestone areas. The caves "Na Pomezí", rich in dropstone decoration and historically valuable caves "Na Špičáku" are also opened for tourists.

Fauna
Many kinds of wild animals live in the forests here: deer, roebuck, wild boar, hare; in the Šerák and Keprník area chamois, imported here from Austria Alpen in the beginning of the century. In the Jeseníky the grouse, hazel hen, black grouse, from birds of prey hawk, buzzard and rare falcon still nest in the region.

Nature protection
In 1969 the Protected Landscape Area (CHKO) Jeseník was founded, comprising the mountain ridge of Hrubý Jeseník and a part of the Zlatohorská vrchovina (Highlands). Specifically valuable areas are protected in national reserves: Šerák-Keprník with conserved virgin forest and distinguished flora and Rejvíz with the highmoor bog and rich fauna and flora. Similar importance has the National Reserve Rašeliniště Skřitek ("the peat bog") and the largest and most valuable nature reservation Praděd with famous Velký and Malý Kotel (Big and Little Kettle) called the "Botanic Garden of the Middle Europe". The National Nature Monument Špičák is known with its karst formation and ingenuous growths of yew.

Climate
Geomorphological diversity is incidental to climatic diversity as well. The rough climate of Hrubý Jeseník penetrates the moderate climate of Silesian Lowlands and causes frequent turns at weather. This specifically moderate climate with low precipitations is in Vidnavka area situated in the precipitation shadow of the Jeseník (Mts.).

History
This mountain region has been already settled in the 12th century by Slavonic populations, which is documented by preserved place-names and fieldnames. The process of colonization was accomplished in the next century by the arrival of the German population. The Jeseník region was a part of the Nysa-Otmuchow principality and by Church in hands of the Wrocław bishops. German colonization was the work of Wrocław bishops Thomas I. and above all Thomas II. Since the 13th century the Czech, German and Polish influences have been mixed here, in addition to other nationalities such as Slovaks, Greeks, Romanians and Ukrainians.

Prospectors of noble metals and miners formed the important part of new settlers. The gold mining in the eras of the top and late Middle Ages was connected with personalities as were for example German businessmen kin of Fuggers from Augsburg. In the next centuries periods of economic prosperity and stability alternated with periods of the spirit and material breakdown. Especially the years of religious wars belonged to the darkest periods of the history. They brought the population much suffering and affliction.

An economic decline arrived with The Hussite Wars, when troops of warriors of God passed the country in their crusade against Wrocław. In 1424 the castles and bishop's towns of the region were captured. Much more disasters were brought by passes of armies during the Thirty Years Wars, which involved especially to country population the period of horrific, slaughter, and firing of farm-houses. Certainly it is not a hazard that just in that time of deep economic and moral declination the Jeseník region was affected by the wave of spiritual cancer in inquisition trials with alleged wise women. The trials framed in Jeseník and Nysa regions in the years 1622–1684, cost hundreds of human victims. Wars of Austria Heritage also unfavourably affected the region in the fortieth years of the 18th century.

The Treaty of Breslau in 1742 split Silesia into two parts: Prussian and Austrian shares. The Jeseník region has devoted to Austrian Silesia since that year. After the separation of original economic centre in Nysa, it created a new administrative area called the Czech part of the Nysa principality. This status existed to the year 1848, when it died out with the feudal system.

Among glorious periods of the country below the Praděd there are for example beginnings of industrial enterprising in the last centuries (ferrous metallurgy, textile industry, stone industry). Origin and development of a spa resort forms the particularly important chapter in the regional history.

Economy
The nature conditions, mineral resources and separation from centres inside the country determine the way of life of its inhabitants. The whole region is of agricultural and industrial character. Beside the quarrying and treatment of granite, limestone and marble, also the woodwork, textile and other branches of industries have arisen here. The mining of base metals and gold, having been kept at Zlaté Hory is declining now. Agriculture is prosperous particularly in undulated and fertile plain between Vidnava, Bernartice and Javorník called "Silesian Hanakia" due to its fairly sunny climate.

Complete list of municipalities
Bělá pod Pradědem – 
Bernartice – 
Bílá Voda – 
Černá Voda – 
Česká Ves – 
Hradec-Nová Ves – 
Javorník – 
Jeseník – 
Kobylá nad Vidnavkou – 
Lipová-lázně – 
Mikulovice – 
Ostružná – 
Písečná – 
Skorošice – 
Stará Červená Voda – 
Supíkovice – 
Uhelná – 
Vápenná – 
Velká Kraš – 
Velké Kunětice – 
Vidnava – 
Vlčice – 
Zlaté Hory – 
Žulová

References

External links
 Jeseník Official Site  at Jeseník.org
 MOS - Městská a obecní statistika  at the Czech Statistical Office

 
Districts of the Czech Republic